This list of botanical gardens in Kenya is intended to include all significant botanical gardens and arboretums in Kenya.

See also

 Protected areas of Kenya
 List of botanical gardens
 List of tourist attractions worldwide

Notes

External links 

 Biodiversity Atlas Kenya

Kenya
 List
Botanical gardens